Echinocyamus pusillus, commonly known as the pea urchin or green urchin, is a species of sand dollar, a sea urchin in the family Fibulariidae, native to the northeastern Atlantic Ocean and the Mediterranean Sea.

Description
The anterior end is slightly pointed. The aboral (upper) surface is convex while the oral (lower) surface is flat. The ambulacral plates widen and form a petal-like pattern on the aboral surface, and it is through each of these areas that six to nine pairs of tube feet protrude. The whole test is clad in short dense spines, giving the living animal a furry appearance; spines of two types are present, relatively long, sharply-pointed ones and shorter ones with serrated tips. The mouth is in the centre of the oral surface and the anus is also on the oral surface but further back. The colour of this sea urchin is greenish or yellowish-grey, and it turns bright green if it gets injured.

Distribution and habitat
Echinocyamus pusillus has a wide distribution in the northeastern Atlantic Ocean. Its range extends southwards from Iceland, Norway and Denmark to the Azores, Cape Bojador in Western Sahara, and the Mediterranean Sea. It is common in the North Sea and round the coasts of Britain. Gravel and coarse sand provide suitable habitat in which it can bury itself.

Ecology
The spines are covered with fine, hair-like cilia, and are used to burrow or creep through the sediment while the animal searches for its food. It feeds on detritus, Foraminifera, diatoms and other edible particles, moving these with its tube feet to its mouth, where they are crushed by its jaws, and the organic matter is separated from the sediment. It is often found in association with such sea urchins as Spatangus purpureus and Psammechinus miliaris, the starfish Asterias rubens and the brittle star Ophiura albida.

References

Clypeasteroida
Fauna of the Atlantic Ocean
Fauna of the Mediterranean Sea
Animals described in 1776
Taxa named by Otto Friedrich Müller